Journey into Unknown Worlds was a science-fiction/horror/fantasy title from Atlas (pre-Marvel) Comics published during the 1950s.

The series continued from Timely Comics' teen-humor series Teen Comics and ran from Sept. 1950 - Aug. 1957.

It featured artists such as Joe Kubert, Steve Ditko, Al Williamson, Reed Crandall and Sid Check.

References

External links
Journey into Unknown Worlds at the Marvel Database wiki
Journey into Unknown Worlds at Atlas Tales

1951 comics debuts
Atlas Comics titles
Fantasy comics
Horror comics
science fiction comics